Mircea Cătălin Ilie (born 5 March 1977 in Bucharest, Romania) is a Romanian former football player who plays as a striker.

External links
 
 

1977 births
Living people
Footballers from Bucharest
Romanian footballers
Association football forwards
Liga I players
Liga II players
FC Dinamo București players
FCM Bacău players
ASC Oțelul Galați players
FC U Craiova 1948 players
CS Pandurii Târgu Jiu players
CSM Ceahlăul Piatra Neamț players
FC UTA Arad players
CSM Jiul Petroșani players
AFC Dacia Unirea Brăila players
CS Corvinul Hunedoara players